Francisca Aronsson (born 12 June 2006) is a Swedish-Peruvian actress, singer and model. She is known for her leading role in the film Margarita (2016) and her participation in series and television programs such as Al fondo hay Sitio, Ven, baila, Quinceañera and in the role of Rita, in El internado: Las Cumbres.

Life 
She moved with her family to Peru in 2014. After work in the theater, she participated in the television talent show, El gran show, hosted by Gisela Valcárcel.

In 2016, Aronsson appeared in the main role of the film Margarita and its sequel Margarita 2, directed by Frank Pérez-Garland. She appeared in El Gran Criollo (2017), Hotel Paraíso (2019). She appeared in series such as Al fondo hay Sitio (2015–2016), Ven, baila, Quinceañera (2015–2018) and I'll find you again (2020).  she plays the role of Rita in the Spanish series El internado: Las Cumbres.

In 2020, she was appointed a UNICEF ambassador, advocating for the rights of girls and adolescents. She was interviewed on Día D.

Family 
Her uncle is Erik Bolin and her aunt is Christian Serratos.

References 

2006 births
Living people
Singers from Gothenburg
Swedish stage actresses
Peruvian stage actresses
Peruvian musical theatre actresses
Swedish musical theatre actresses
Swedish television actresses
Peruvian television actresses
Swedish film actresses
Peruvian film actresses
Peruvian YouTubers
Swedish YouTubers